Hellfjorden is an arm of the Brandsfjorden in the municipality of Åfjord in Trøndelag county, Norway. The village of Sumstad lies along the eastern side of the fjord. The Norwegian County Road 14 runs along the southern and eastern sides of the fjord.

See also
 List of Norwegian fjords

References

Fjords of Trøndelag
Åfjord